Mysore-Ooty Road or Mysore-Udhagamandalam Road is a tourist trail of South India starting from Mysore in Karnataka state and ending in Udhagamandalam in Nilgiri district of Tamil Nadu state, India. Both routes pass through Bandipur National park in Karnataka and Mudumalai National Park in Tamil Nadu.
At the crossing there are statues of a tiger, a leopard, a gaur, a deer and an elephant.

Distance
 Small vehicles take a 124 km route by Mysore-Theppakkadu-Masinagudi-Kallati-Ooty Road.
 Buses and trucks take a longer route of 158 km route by Mysore-Theppakkadu-Gudalur-Pykara-Ooty Road.

Ooty is well connected by roads. Ooty is situated on NH 181 and is connected by road via the five main accepted Nilgiri Ghat Roads. Bus services operated by TNSTC and KSRTC  connect major towns in the state and nearby towns in the district such as Coonoor, Kotagiri, and Gudalur, Mysore and Gundalpet.

Bandipur National Park

Bandipur National Park established in 1974 as a tiger reserve under Project Tiger, is a national park located in the south Indian state of Karnataka. It was once a private hunting reserve for the Maharaja of the Kingdom of Mysore but has now been upgraded to Bandipur Tiger Reserve. Bandipur is known for its wildlife and has many types of biomes, but dry deciduous forest is dominant.

Together with the adjoining Nagarhole National Park, Mudumalai National Park and Wayanad Wildlife Sanctuary, it is part of the Nilgiri Biosphere Reserve totaling  making it the largest protected area in southern India and largest habitate of wild elephants in south Asia.
Bandipur is located in Gundlupet taluq of Chamarajanagar district. As a result, Bandipur sees a lot of tourist traffic and there are many wildlife fatalities caused by speeding vehicles that are reported each year. There is a ban on traffic from 9 pm to 6 am of dusk to dawn to help bring down the death rate of wildlife.

Mudumalai National Park

It shares its boundaries with the states of Karnataka and Kerala. The sanctuary is divided into five ranges – Masinagudi, Thepakadu, Mudumalai, Kargudi and Nellakota.

The protected area is home to several endangered and vulnerable species including Indian elephant, Bengal tiger, gaur and Indian leopard. There are at least 266 species of birds in the sanctuary, including critically endangered Indian white-rumped vulture and long-billed vulture.

The driving experience

Mysore to Nanjangud
The road in this sector is two track with a toll booth in the middle. The major tourist attraction is the S.G.S.Ashram with an aviary, library and museum inside.  There are good restaurants like Rhythm.n.Hues, The Evergreen, the Grand View and Vishnu Cafe before reaching the airport.  This is a very silent airport as no flights are operational now. Before airport there is a scenic place with a lake and bend in the road. After Kadakola town, there are two Punjabi dhabha restaurants offering private outdoor huts. There is a riverside temple at Sujathapuram and also India's oldest railway bridge is located here. Cafe Coffee Day has an outlet here. Royal Hotel provides Kerala style food. Nanjangud town has many lodges and restaurants.

Nanjangud to Gundlupet
This stretch also has two way road without any toll. There are some beautiful churches and temples on this way.  Many Kerala restaurants dot either side of the road. There is a drive-in-cafe 15 km from Nanjangud.  There is an outlet of Cafe Coffee Day another ten kilometer forward.

Gundlupet to Gudalur
This is a single line track passing through two national parks.  You can find humps every 300 meters and the driving is very unpleasant. Night traffic is banned and animal sightings are rare during daytime except for elephants and deer.

Gudalur to Ooty
This is a very scenic uphill route but traffic blocks are very common near the Frog Hill viewpoint.  They last for one or two hours. The two sides of the road are very scenic with shola forests, undulating hills and lakes.

Image gallery

References

Nilgiris district
Roads in Mysore district
Roads in Chamarajanagar district
Roads in Tamil Nadu
Roads in Mysore